СAMERTON (Russian: Камеры (видеокамеры) + Камертон (синхронизация)) is a Russian global vehicle tracking system. Using tracking software integrated with a distributed network of radar complexes, photo-video fixation and road surveillance cameras, it identifies probable routes and places of the most frequent appearance of a particular vehicle. It was developed and implemented by the "Advanced Scientific - Research Projects" enterprise in St. Petersburg. 

Within the framework of the practical use of the system of the Ministry of Internal Affairs of the Russian Federation, the system has enabled identification and solving of especially grave crimes; the system is also operated by other state services and departments.

References

Mass intelligence-gathering systems